Schiavi is an Italian surname. Notable people with the surname include:

Alberto Schiavi (born 1939), West-German born Italian sprint canoer
Bruno Schiavi (born 1972), Australian fashion designer and businessman
Fabrizio Schiavi (born 1971), graphic designer and type designer
Juan Pablo Schiavi (born 1957), Argentinian agronomist and politician
Lea Schiavi (1907–1942), Italian dissident journalist
Mark Schiavi (born 1964), former English footballer
Nicolás Schiavi (born 1995), Argentine footballer
Raffaele Schiavi (born 1986), Italian footballer
Rolando Schiavi (born 1973), former Argentine footballer
Viviana Schiavi (born 1982), Italian footballer

Italian-language surnames